Chevalier Alfredo Duprat was born in Lisbon on 21 July 1816 and was a member for Portugal on the Combined Anglo-Portuguese Commission dealing with captured slavers. Major Duprat was the first Commanding Officer of Cape Town Volunteer Artillery (CVA) when the unit was raised in Cape Town on 26 August 1857.

South African military personnel
1816 births
Year of death missing
People from Lisbon
Cape Colony army officers